Pedro Contreras González (born 7 January 1972) is a Spanish retired footballer who played as a goalkeeper.

He played in 246 La Liga games over the course of 13 seasons, representing in the competition Real Madrid, Rayo Vallecano, Málaga and Betis.

Contreras was called up for Spain at the 2002 World Cup.

Club career
A product of Real Madrid's youth system, Madrid-born Contreras picked up a UEFA Champions League winner's medal in 1998, even though he did not play a minute during the season. He spent four years with the B-side, Real Madrid Castilla, and appeared in four first-team games in the 1998–99 campaign as the former finished runner-up; for 1996–97, he was loaned out to Rayo Vallecano where he only missed one league match in 42, being however relegated from La Liga.

Contreras moved to Málaga CF in the 1999–2000 season. There, he was the undisputed first-choice, missing only six top division contests from 1999 to 2003.

Contreras signed for Real Betis in the 2003 summer, making 22 league appearances during his debut campaign but none in the following due to injury and the rise of Toni Doblas. In 2005–06 he competed in both the UEFA Cup and the Champions League, where he kept a clean sheet against Chelsea in a 1–0 group stage win.

Loaned to Cádiz CF (also in Andalusia, Segunda División) for 2007–08, alongside Dani, Contreras was released at the end of the season. He subsequently retired from the game, and rejoined former club Málaga as a goalkeeping coach. He resigned from his post on 18 January, 2020.

International career
Contreras was third-choice for the Spain national team in the 2002 FIFA World Cup, a late addition to coach José Antonio Camacho's squad after first-choice Santiago Cañizares was injured in a freak accident. He received his only cap in a 0–0 home draw against Paraguay in Logroño, on 16 October of that year.

Honours
Real Madrid
Supercopa de España: 1997

Málaga
UEFA Intertoto Cup: 2002

Betis
Copa del Rey: 2004–05

References

External links

Betisweb stats and bio 
Stats and bio at Cadistas1910 

1972 births
Living people
Footballers from Madrid
Spanish footballers
Association football goalkeepers
La Liga players
Segunda División players
Real Madrid Castilla footballers
Real Madrid CF players
Rayo Vallecano players
Málaga CF players
Real Betis players
Cádiz CF players
Spain international footballers
2002 FIFA World Cup players
UEFA Champions League winning players